AFSS can refer to :

Autonomous Flight Safety System, used on rockets for range safety
Automated Flight service station, air traffic facility e.g. in USA